Corey Smith (born September 18, 1969), better known by his stage name  Mr. Serv-On, is an American rapper from New Orleans, Louisiana. Mr. Serv-On  is best known for his time spent with No Limit Records, out of New Orleans, in the mid-to-late 1990s.

Music career

Music beginnings
A high school friend of Master P, Mr. Serv-On was one of the first rappers signed to No Limit. First appearing on albums by Master P, TRU and Mia X. His first appearance was on Soulja Slim's (Then known as Magnolia Slim) album "Soulja fa Lyfe", in 1994.

1997-99: TRU, No Limit, Life Insurance & Da Next Level
On August 12, 1997 Mr Serv-On's debut album, Life Insurance. Life Insurance was met with commercial and critical success, peaking at number 23 on the US charts and number 5 on the R&B charts, in 2013, it was ranked 20th on a list of the top 25 No Limit releases.

On February 16, 1999 Mr. Serv-On would release his second album Da Next Level it would be released to a bigger commercial success, making it to number 1 on the R&B charts selling 297,000 copies in its first week. Part of the reason he gained more mainstream attention is because of his featuring of the rapper Big Pun on his album. The guest verse from Pun on the first single from the album titled "From N.Y. To N.O." was ranked on a list of his best guest verses. On Dec 29, 1999 the album had sold 973,000 copies in the U.S. being certified platinum by the RIAA. After the album's release Mr. Serv-On would disband from No Limit Records & start his own label, Lifetime Entertainment.

2000-03: War Is Me, Pt. 1: Battle Decisions, Take a Sip & No More Questions
On June 20, 2000 Mr. Serv-On would release his third album & first independent album titled War Is Me, Pt. 1: Battle Decisions, it only made it to number 75 on the R&B charts. On October 30, 2001 Mr. Serv-On would release his fourth album titled Take a Sip via Lifetime, K.O.K., Street Level, the album would fail to make any of the Billboard charts. On March 18, 2003 Mr. Serv-On released his fifth album & second independent album titled No More Questions via Lifetime, the album would fail to make any of the Billboard charts.

2008-09: Life Insurance 2 (Heart Muzik) & Gangsta 1 More Time
On March 18, 2003 Mr. Serv-On would release his sixth album & third independent album titled Life Insurance 2 (Heart Muzik) via Lifetyme, the album would fail to make any of the Billboard charts. Mr. Serv-On signed to  Killa C's Dirty Thug Recordz in 2009 & would release his seventh album titled Gangsta 1 More Timeon November 17, 2009, the album would fail to make any of the Billboard charts. On March 18, 2003 Mr. Serv-On would release his eighth album titled Internet Platinum via Lifetyme, Hustle Blooc the album would fail to make any of the Billboard charts.

2013-present: Street Dreams & The Fallen Soldier
On December 20, 2013, he announced the release of his new mixtape  "Guaparation Canal", which was slated to be released in February 2014.

On March 4, 2014 Revolution Entertainment would release the collaborative album "Known Associates" by SC and Mr. Serv-On.

On September 18, Serv-On announced his next release would be Boss Certified with a release date of October 28, 2014. This album will be distributed through Serv-On`s own label, Hot City Music. On December 2, 2014, Mr. Serv-On released his ninth album Street Dreams, this album was released through Timez Up. Ent. & was executive produced by DJ Suckafree. On June 19, 2015 Mr. Serv-On would release his tenth album titled The Fallen Soldier via Hot City Music & Timez Up.

Other ventures

Acting career
Mr. Serv-On appeared in the movie "I'm Bout It" in 1997, and in a documentary 10 years later called "Grittin 2 Get It In Tha Rock." In 2008, Mr. Serv-On was interviewed for the Underground Kingz Magazine DVD. In 2014, Mr. Serv-On appeared in the documentary "We Are One: Street Music of New Orleans."

Author
In 2008, Mr. Serv-On wrote a dating book for black women.

Philanthropy
In October 2014, Mr. Serv-On participated in a gun buy-back program in New Orleans.

Discography

Studio albums

Independent albums

Extended Play's

Collaboration albums

Soundtrack albums

Mixtapes

Compilation albums

Singles

As lead artist

As featured artist

Guest appearances

Filmography

See also 
 No Limit Records
 Beats by the Pound

References

African-American male rappers
Living people
No Limit Records artists
Rappers from New Orleans
Gangsta rappers
1969 births
21st-century American rappers
21st-century American male musicians
21st-century African-American musicians
20th-century African-American people